Li Xiaomeng (born 20 September 1973) is a Chinese former television host. She won the Golden Eagle Award for the Most Popular Host in 2008, and the Golden Mike Award in 2010.

Biography
Li was born in Beijing in September 1973, after graduating from Communication University of China in 1996, she joined the China Central Television, she hosted 24 Hours, News Probe, and News 1+1.

Works

Television
 24 Hours
 News 1+1
 News Probe

Awards
 2010 Golden Mike Award
 2008 Golden Eagle Award for the Most Popular Host

Personal life
Li has a daughter, who was born on 13 January 2012.

References

1973 births
People from Beijing
Communication University of China alumni
Living people
Chinese television personalities